Richard Conlon (born 1965 in Hemel Hempstead) is an English playwright.

His plays for young people are published by Heinemann, an arm of Pearson Education. As well as his own original works he has adapted Benjamin Zephaniah’s novel ‘'Face'’ and ‘'Whispers in the Graveyard'’ by Theresa Brelsin for the stage. Both are published as play-texts for schools internationally. In 2010 he wrote Wasted for Forest Forge Theatre Company.

His work has been performed by youth theatres in venues including the Lawrence Batley Theatre, Birmingham Rep, The Watermill (Newbury), The Georgian Theatre Royal (Richmond) and The Castle Theatre (Wellingborough). His plays have also been performed in Ireland, the USA and New Zealand.

During his career, Conlon has been the recipient of two Arts Council England Awards, one of which was for the creation of ‘Hope Springs’ which has been performed in theatres across the UK, including at the Edinburgh Festival Fringe. A play inspired by an article by Guardian journalist Decca Aitkenhead. Conlon has received commissions from Farnham Maltings, Forest Forge Theatre Company, Bristol City Council, Take Art, The Old Vic and Somerset County Council.

In 2009 he began collaborating with Hampshire's Forest Forge Theatre Company on Lucy Clifford’s short story ‘Wooden Tony’. This turned into a play called ‘The Boy at the Edge of the Room’ which premiered in March 2013. The same short story has also been turned into a large-cast community piece called ‘Very Small and Very far Away’.

Conlon is a member of the Writers' Guild of Great Britain, NAWE (National Association of Writers in Education) and NAYT (National Association of Youth Theatres). He lives just outside the Dorset town of Shaftesbury. In 2016 he took on the role of co-Artistic Director of Winchester's Blue Apple Theatre Company.

References

Published works

 Hope Springs (2006) Heinemann 
 Face (2008) Heinemann 
 Whispers in the graveyard (2009) Heinemann 
 Paving Paradise (2010) Heinemann 
 The Death Of Jude Hill (2011) Heinemann  (part of Pearson Education's ‘Heroes’ series)
 The Emigrant's Friend (2013) Phoenix, Australia 

1965 births
Living people
English dramatists and playwrights
English male dramatists and playwrights